Old Scars, New Wounds is the second album by American heavy metal supergroup Act of Defiance, released on September 29, 2017, for label Metal Blade Records and produced by Dave Otero, Steve White and group member/guitarist Chris Broderick.

The singles released from this album are "M.I.A." on August 8 and "Overexposure" on September 7.

Track listing
All tracks written  by Henry Derek, Chris Broderick, Matthew Bachand and Shawn Drover.

Personnel
Henry Derek - lead vocals
Chris Broderick - guitar, backing vocals
Matthew Bachand - bass guitar
Shawn Drover - drums

References

2017 albums
Act of Defiance albums
Metal Blade Records albums